These are the official results of the Women's high jump event at the 1972 Summer Olympics in Munich. The competition was held on 3 and 4 of September.  Austrian Ilona Gusenbauer was the favorite after her 1971 European Athletics Championships victory.  There were 40 jumpers and 23 qualified for the final making it a long day for the jumpers involved with such a big field.  This competition still used a mixture of the straddle technique and the newer Fosbury Flop technique.  Meyfarth at the age of 16 years, 123 days, was and still is the youngest winner of an individual medal in athletics.

Results
All jumpers reaching  and the top 12 including ties qualified for the finals.  All qualifiers are listed in blue.  All heights are listed in metres.

Qualifying

Final

Key: WR = world record; o = cleared height; p = passed at height; x = failed jump; NM = no mark; DNS = did not start

References

External links
 Official report

Women's high jump
High jump at the Olympics
1972 in women's athletics
Women's events at the 1972 Summer Olympics